Trudell is a 2005 documentary film about American Indian activist and poet John Trudell.  The film traces Trudell's life from his childhood in Omaha, Nebraska, through his role as a leader of the American Indian Movement. It also covers his rebirth as a musician and spoken word poet after his wife died in a house fire suspected as arson.

Heather Rae produced and directed the film, which took her more than a decade to complete. Trudell aired nationally in the U.S. on April 11, 2006 as part of the Independent Lens series on PBS.

Reception
The film received generally mixed reviews from the critics.

References

External links
www.trudellthemovie.com (archived February 2014)
Trudell site for Independent Lens on PBS

2005 films
American documentary films
Documentary films about Native Americans
Documentary films about poets
2005 documentary films
Documentary films about music and musicians
Films about activists
2000s American films